76th parallel may refer to:

76th parallel north, a circle of latitude in the Northern Hemisphere
76th parallel south, a circle of latitude in the Southern Hemisphere
The 76th Parallel Escarpment, an escarpment in Antarctica, also known as the Usas Escarpment